Jan Cornelisz Vermeyen, or Jan Mayo, or Barbalonga (c. 1504 – 1559) was a Dutch Northern Renaissance painter.

Biography
Based on his will, rediscovered in 1998, Vermeyen was born in Beverwijk in 1504 (possibly 1503 or 1505). According to Karel van Mander he was honored for his career in the service of Charles V. He was a friend of Jan van Scorel and his portrait was engraved by Jan Wierix for Dominicus Lampsonius.

Vermeyen was a painter and tapestry designer, probably a pupil of Jan Gossaert. About 1525 he became court painter to Margaret of Austria, regent of the Netherlands, aunt of Holy Roman Emperor Charles V at Mechelen. Between 1530 and 1535 he was active in Augsburg and Innsbruck. In 1535 he accompanied the Emperor Charles V, the nephew of the Archduchess, at the Conquest of Tunis. He worked in Spain in 1536, after which he moved to Brussels, where he stayed until his death. He "designed a set of twelve tapestries commemorating scenes from the campaign that would travel with Charles wherever he went, to bear witness to this triumph." The still existing painting (and also copies of it by Rubens) of the Hafsid King of Tunis Moulay Hassan, whom Charles re-instated on his throne after ridding the city of the pirate Hayreddin Barbarossa, was painted by Vermeyen while there.

This journey supplied him with scenes for later works, including tapestries designed in 1545/48 for Charles V's sister Regent of Hungary, Mary of Hungary. He died in Brussels.

Many portraits are ascribed to him on very little evidence, according to modern scholars. He was followed by Willem de Pannemaker and Jan van Hemessen.

References

Sources
Jan Cornelisz. Vermeyen on Artnet
http://www.artcyclopedia.com/artists/vermeyen_jan.html
Horn, Hendrick . J., Jan Cornelisz Vermeyen, painter of Charles V and his conquest of Tunis, Paintings, Etchings, Drawings, Cartoons and Tapestries, 2 vols., Doornspijk, (1989).504 pp., + 340 ills. in b/w and 32 in col., 4to, orig. cloth/d-jacket.
http://www.arcadja.com/auctions/en/vermeyen_jan_cornelisz_/artist/49833/

Further reading
 (see index)

External links
 

1504 births
1559 deaths
Flemish Renaissance painters
Dutch Renaissance painters
People from Beverwijk
Court painters
Flemish tapestry artists